The Way Out is a German-Russian 2015 short film directed, written and produced by Mikhail Uchitelev. It premiered in the Short Film Corner of the 2015 Cannes Film Festival. It was awarded the Grand Prix at the International Festival "Reflections of Spirit" in Erlangen, Germany, the Best Supporting Actor award at The Short Film Awards International Festival in New York,  and the Best Actress award at the Blow-Up International Arthouse Film Festival. It was officially selected at the Roving Eye International Film Festival (the partner of the Oscar-qualifying Flickers' Rhode Island International Film Festival).

Synopsis
The story takes place in Eastern Europe in late 1941. Edith (Elina Amromina) is a Jewish opera diva that has been hidden away from the Nazis by Gustav (Alexander Alexeyev), who puts her in the theater's cellar during the occupation. Despite his reassurances that she will not be found, Edith knows that Gustav's help puts his own life at risk and decides that she must leave the theater to avoid this. Gustav tries to convince her that there must be a different option, but Edith is too terrified to listen and tries to escape. She's brought back by Gustav but is unfortunately seen by Nazis in the process. The Nazi commandant (Artur Kharitonenko) storms into the theater and demands that Gustav hands over Edith or he will be killed. Viewing all of this from a corner of the theater, Edith decides that she must leave for the commandant's office and surrender. Aware that this is her intention, Gustav tries to intercept her and in the process witnesses the murder of someone that he believes to be Edith. However, unbeknownst to him this was not Edith, who instead locked herself in the cellar while she tries to find another way out. The next day she decides to go to the commandant's office and save Gustav's life. As the theater is completely cordoned off she sees only one way out.

Cast
 Elina Amromina as Edith Goldschmidt
 Alexander Alexeyev as Gustav, a theater director
 Aleksey  Morozov as Tenor
 Tatiana Ryabokon as Make-up artist
 Artur Kharitonenko as SS commandant

Reception
The Way Out received generally positive reviews and the Saint Petersburg Evening Post praised the work for effectively using its 33-minute length to its advantage. A reviewer for Jüdische Rundschau gave a favorable review for the work, comparing it positively to Caravaggio's masterpieces. The Gazeta Strela also had praise for the film, which they felt told its story in a "heartfelt and intimate manner". The film has been officially presented at the Russian Pavilion at the Cannes Festival and this event has been covered by Proficinema. and also by ROSKINO. The film received a positive review at the TMFF.

References

External links
 
 kino-teatr.ru website

Russian short films
2015 films
Holocaust films
German drama short films
Films set in a theatre